"Alone" is a song composed by Billy Steinberg and Tom Kelly, who recorded it under the name i-Ten on their 1983 album Taking a Cold Look.

It was later recorded by actress Valerie Stevenson and actor John Stamos on the original soundtrack of the CBS sitcom Dreams in 1984. American rock band Heart covered it on their 1987 album Bad Animals, and this version reached number one in the US and Canada. In 2007 Celine Dion recorded it for her album Taking Chances. In 2010 Alyssa Reid used the music and lyrics for the chorus of her song Alone Again.

Original Steinberg and Kelly version
Alone is a rock ballad composed by Billy Steinberg and Tom Kelly, who recorded it under the name i-Ten on their 1983 album Taking a Cold Look. It was included as the third track of the album. It debuted inauspiciously and I-Ten did not record any other albums prior to disbanding.

Dreams version

In late 1984, actress Valerie Stevenson and actor John Stamos covered the song for the CBS Sitcom Dreams under their roles as Lisa Copley and Gino Minelli. 

It appeared on the episode of the same name where the band perform the song for Frank and Louise's anniversary party. It is the earliest cover of the song. In that  episode, Frank and Gino write a poem and turn it into a song. The episode aired on November 7, 1984. The song was released as a single that same day, but did not chart.

Heart version

Heart released the song as the first single from their ninth studio album, Bad Animals, in May 1987. Their version is a power ballad that begins with a piano line and a subdued vocal from Ann Wilson, leading to a synth-led hard-rock chorus. Tom Kelly, the song's coauthor and himself an experienced session singer, provided the high harmony parts on the record.
 
Cash Box said that it's "a potent, emotion-drenched rock ballad that features Ann Wilson’s signature billowing, riveting vocal performance."

"Alone" spent three weeks at No. 1 on the U.S. Billboard Hot 100 in July 1987. It ranked No. 2 on the Billboard Year-End Top Pop Singles of 1987. It is also Heart's most successful single in the United Kingdom, where it peaked at No. 3 on the UK Singles Chart in June. It is the band's only song to peak inside the UK Top 5.

The song was also a global hit, reaching No. 1 in Canada, the top five in Ireland, Norway, and Switzerland, the top ten in Australia, Belgium and the Netherlands as well as the top twenty in West Germany. An "unplugged" version of the song later appeared on Heart's 1995 album The Road Home. An extended version of "Alone" (5:30 long) was included on the Japanese 3" mini-CD of Heart's third single from Bad Animals, "There's the Girl".

Music video
The video for the song was directed by Marty Callner, and was released in June 1987. It starts with Ann at the top of a balcony singing to Nancy, who is at the bottom (similar to the famous "Romeo & Juliet" scene). Ann is then seen in all black, including a funeral veil and gown. The two sisters are then seen performing the refrain to an audience on stage, when Nancy's piano collapses at the first bang of the chorus. During the second verse, a broken-down and dilapidated set is seen, with Nancy playing the piano within it. Nancy is then seen riding atop a black horse and jumping out on stage with her guitar as the instrumental section kicks in. It then shows Ann, in the all-black outfit within the broken set and thereby resembling a witch, before cutting directly back to the stage performance as the song reaches its climax. As the song fades out, a shot of Ann and Nancy together is shown, with each one looking directly into each other's eyes, before finally finishing with a quick shot of Ann's face as the screen goes black.

Charts

Weekly charts
{|class="wikitable sortable plainrowheaders" style="text-align:center"
|+Weekly chart performance for Heart's cover
!scope="col"|Chart (1987)
!scope="col"|Peakposition
|-
!scope="row"|Australia (KMR)
|6
|-

|-

|-

|-

|-
!scope="row"|Canada (The Record'''s Retail Singles Chart)
|1
|-
!scope="row"|Europe (European Hot 100 Singles)
|9
|-

|-

|-

|-

|-

|-

|-

|-

|-

|-
!scope="row"|West Germany (Official German Charts)
|18
|-
|}

Year-end charts

All-time charts

Certifications and sales

Celine Dion version

Celine Dion covered "Alone" for her tenth English-language studio album, Taking Chances (2007). It was released as the second single in Europe and North America, and third in the United Kingdom in 2008. Produced by Ben Moody, ex-member of Evanescence, the song divided music critics. While some picked it as one of the best tracks on Taking Chances, others thought that the cover was too similar with the original.

Background and release
Dion covered "Alone" in 2007 for her tenth English studio album, Taking Chances, released that year. The version was produced by Ben Moody, former member of rock band Evanescence. Dion's version features tinkling pianos and enveloping strings. It was released as the second single in Europe and North America, and third in the United Kingdom. The digital single release in the UK on May 5, 2008, was coincided with the British leg of the Taking Chances World Tour. In October 2008, "Alone" was included on the European version of My Love: Essential Collection. A live version was included in the Taking Chances World Tour: The Concert CD/DVD.

Critical reception
Music critics were divided on "Alone". Stephen Thomas Erlewine from AllMusic picked the song as one of the best tracks on Taking Chances, and wrote that "Celine attempts to snatch Heart's 'Alone' from Carrie Underwood and cribs from Kelly Clarkson's operatic rock, two blatant thieveries that, when combined with the quartet of explicit changeups, gives Taking Chances a vaguely desperate vibe, as if Celine needs to prove that she still reigns supreme among all divas".<ref name=allmusicreview>Erlewine, Stephen (November 17, 2007) Taking Chances - Review | Allmusic AllMusic - Rovi Corporation Retrieved February 28, 2011.</ref> Sarah Rodman wrote for The Boston Globe that "Enlisting former Evanescence guitarist Ben Moody adds little; in fact, the carbon-copy arrangement doesn't pack as much windswept melodramatic punch as Dion's own 'It's All Coming Back to Me Now.' Great vocal, terrific melody, a fine rendition, but 'Alone' is already indelibly stamped by Heart's Ann Wilson".

Toronto Star editor Ashante Infantry called this song "sentimental, cringe-worthy diva track". Chuck Taylor of Billboard called it "a rowdy cover". Rob Sheffield of Rolling Stone gave the song a negative review, writing: "That's nothing compared to Dion shrieking the ten millionth version of Heart's 'Alone' (mad pitchy, dog!), produced by ex-Evanescence guitarist Ben Moody – Amy Lee, meet the fugliest bullet you ever dodged".

Commercial performance
The song debuted on November 24, 2007, at No. 85 on the UK Singles Chart. It spent two weeks on the chart. After selling 12,535 copies, it entered the US Bubbling Under Hot 100 Singles at No. 24 and Canadian Hot 100 at No. 57. It entered the Swedish Singles Chart, due to strong digital sales, and peaked at No. 52.

Music video and live performances
The music video was taken from Dion's CBS TV special That's Just the Woman in Me and released on March 8, 2008. Dion promoted "Alone" at that time in France, performing it on Star Academy. On November 23, 2007, she went to the American talkshow The View to perform "Taking Chances" as well as "Alone". Dion performed the song during most dates of her Taking Chances World Tour; the performance was included in the Taking Chances World Tour: The Concert CD/DVD.

Charts

Weekly charts

Year-end charts

Release history

References

External links

Heart - Alone (Official Music Video)

1983 songs
1987 singles
2001 singles
2008 singles
1980s ballads
Billboard Hot 100 number-one singles
Cashbox number-one singles
Capitol Records singles
Celine Dion songs
Columbia Records singles
Epic Records singles
Hard rock ballads
Heart (band) songs
Music videos directed by Marty Callner
Rock ballads
RPM Top Singles number-one singles
Song recordings produced by Ron Nevison
Songs about loneliness
Songs written by Billy Steinberg
Songs written by Tom Kelly (musician)
Songs containing the I–V-vi-IV progression
Warmen songs

pt:Alone (canção de Heart)